Vincent Martin Ball OAM (born 4 December 1923) is an Australian retired character actor of radio, stage and screen, active in the industry for nearly 55 years (with a brief return) firstly in Britain and then his native Australia. He has also authored a number of books.
 
He is best known for film roles in British and Australian films and TV movies, including A Town Like Alice, Breaker Morant, Phar Lap, Muriel's Wedding and The Man Who Sued God. He appeared in numerous TV roles, primarily in cameo guest roles, but had recurring roles in serials like Rush, The Young Doctors  and A Country Practice.

Early life
Born in the town of Wee Waa, New South Wales, in 1923, to a father who worked as a linesman on the New South Wales Government Railways, Ball said he wanted to be an actor from an early age, particularly a "cowboy in the movies".

With the outbreak of the Second World War, Ball left his job with the Australian General Electric Company and, after military training in Canada, became a wireless air gunner with the Royal Australian Air Force, serving in Britain.

After the war, he returned to Australia and his old job, but soon decided to try amateur dramatics. To correct his accent, which had by then morphed into part Canadian, part Cockney and part Australian, he took elocution lessons. He met (and later married) his teacher, leading Sydney actress Doreen Harrop. They have three children and live at Chittaway Point, New South Wales.

Acting career in Britain
Ball wrote letters asking for auditions. One was to the Rank Organisation which, impressed with his enthusiasm, told him to come to England and they would give him a screen test for a part in the 1949 British version of The Blue Lagoon. By the time he got to England, production was under way, but he got a job as stand-in for Donald Houston in an underwater fight with an octopus. He was then cast as Jack Warner's son in Smiling Irish Eyes, (Talk of a Million).

He then won a scholarship to RADA. Having moved to Stowting, Kent, he appeared in supporting and uncredited movie roles in the UK for the next two and a half decades. He was a juvenile lead in the TV films Rain Before Seven, Barnet's Folly and Nitro, before moving into slightly larger parts in films such as A Town Like Alice, Robbery Under Arms, Sea of Sand, and Danger Within. In 1969, he played Cecil Carpenter in Where Eagles Dare, alongside Richard Burton and Clint Eastwood. His television credits in Britain include Compact, Man in a Suitcase, The Troubleshooters, and Dixon of Dock Green, and a recurring role on the long-running UK soap opera Crossroads.

Career in Australia
Ball returned to Australia in 1973. He was soon very busy acting in films, theatre and television.

He is best known for his work in Australian films and television series, including film roles in Breaker Morant, Phar Lap and Muriel's Wedding. His credits in Australian television serials include Cop Shop, The Sullivans, The Young Doctors, The Flying Doctors, Grass Roots and All Saints. His many roles in Australian mini-series or made-for-television films include Against the Wind, and the epic Anzacs.

In 2014, aged 91, he came out of retirement briefly to play a Second World War veteran named Tom Knight, in the Australian soap opera Home and Away, whom Alf Stewart (played by Ray Meagher) meets in hospital. The scenes went to air during April 2015, just before ANZAC Day.

Publications (selected)

Honours
Ball was honoured with the OAM in the 2016 Australia Day honours list.

Filmography

Film

Television

References

External links
 

1923 births
Living people
20th-century Australian male actors
Alumni of RADA
Australian male film actors
Australian male television actors
Royal Australian Air Force personnel of World War II
Recipients of the Medal of the Order of Australia
Royal Australian Air Force airmen
Australian male novelists
21st-century Australian novelists